Rising Damp is a British sitcom written by Eric Chappell. It stars Leonard Rossiter as landlord Rupert Rigsby, Richard Beckinsale as Alan Moore, Frances de la Tour as Ruth Jones, and Don Warrington as Philip Smith. Alan, Miss Jones and Philip reside as lodgers in Rigsby's house.

The original run of Rising Damp was transmitted on ITV in four series from 1974 to 1978. Rising Damp (1980), a feature film based on the programme, premiered on 5 March 1980. It was written by Eric Chappell, and directed by Joseph McGrath.

Series overview

Episodes

Series 1 (1974)

Series 2 (1975)

Series 3 (1977)

Series 4 (1978)

Notes

External links
 Episode Guide in Brief at the authorised Rising Damp website
 
 

Rising Damp
Rising Damp